Benson Gicharu Njangiru (born 3 May 1985) is a Kenyan amateur boxer who won silver at the 2010 Commonwealth Games in Delhi (at flyweight), a bronze medal at the 2014 Commonwealth Games (at bantamweight) and qualified for the 2012 Olympics (at flyweight). His occupation is police officer.

In Delhi 2010 he beat Oteng Oteng but lost to local Suranjoy Mayengbam in the final.

At the 2011 All-Africa Games Oteng won the rematch 10:8 and went on to win the title

At the 2012 African Boxing Olympic Qualification Tournament Oteng won the rubber match but Gicharu qualified for the Olympics anyway. At the 2012 Summer Olympics (results) he lost his first bout 16:19 to Egyptian Hesham Abdelaal.

At the 2014 Commonwealth Games, he competed in the bantamweight division, losing to England's Qais Ashfaq in the semi-final.

References 

1985 births
Living people
Boxers at the 2012 Summer Olympics
Boxers at the 2016 Summer Olympics
Olympic boxers of Kenya
Sportspeople from Nairobi
Flyweight boxers
Boxers at the 2010 Commonwealth Games
Boxers at the 2014 Commonwealth Games
Boxers at the 2018 Commonwealth Games
Kenyan male boxers
Commonwealth Games silver medallists for Kenya
Commonwealth Games bronze medallists for Kenya
Commonwealth Games medallists in boxing
Competitors at the 2011 All-Africa Games
African Games competitors for Kenya
21st-century Kenyan people
Medallists at the 2010 Commonwealth Games
Medallists at the 2014 Commonwealth Games